Adam John Dodd (born 14 May 1993) is an English professional footballer who play as a left back.

Career
Dodd was born in Kirkham, Lancashire, and joined Blackpool at under-10 level. He progressed through the youth teams & sign a two-year scholarship in 2009 along with seven other youngsters. During the 2010–11 season he appeared on the bench in Blackpool's FA Cup tie against Southampton but remained an unused substitute. He signed a full-time professional contract in May 2011 following the completion of his scholarship. A feat he admits would have been difficult without the guidance of Head of Youth Gary Parkinson.

Blackpool allowed Dodd to join Conference North side Altrincham on a month's loan deal. On 3 December 2011, he made his Conference debut at Halifax Town and started his first game, at left-back, on Boxing Day at home to Droylsden. He departed Altrincham on 7 January 2012 having made five league appearances – three of which were starts.

Upon his return to Blackpool he was again loaned out, this time to Scottish club Ayr United. He made his debut for the club in goalless draw against Falkirk in a First Division fixture. Dodd entered the match as 60th-minute substitute, replacing Tam McManus. Before the following match against Hamilton Academical he was joined at club by Blackpool teammate Liam Tomsett who had also agreed a five-month loan. On 21 January 2012, Dodd made his home debut for Ayr at Somerset Park, starting, in a 2–2 draw. He marked the occasion with his first senior competitive goal scoring a free kick from 30-yards, striking the ball with his left foot and curling it into the top right hand corner of the net.

In November 2015 he joined Bamber Bridge.

In May 2019 he joined FC United of Manchester.

Career statistics
.

References

External links

1993 births
Living people
People from Kirkham, Lancashire
English footballers
Association football midfielders
Scottish Football League players
Blackpool F.C. players
Altrincham F.C. players
Ayr United F.C. players
Chorley F.C. players
National League (English football) players
Bamber Bridge F.C. players
F.C. United of Manchester players